The 2020–21 Syed Mushtaq Ali Trophy was the twelfth season of the Syed Mushtaq Ali Trophy, a Twenty20 cricket tournament played in India. It was contested by 38 teams, divided into six groups, with six teams in Group D. Goa, Madhya Pradesh, Rajasthan, Saurashtra, Services and Vidarbha were placed in Group D, with all the matches taking place in Indore. Rajasthan won Group D to qualify for the knockout stage of the tournament.

Points table

Fixtures

Round 1

Round 2

Round 3

Round 4

Round 5

References

Syed Mushtaq Ali Trophy
Syed Mushtaq Ali Trophy
Syed Mushtaq Ali